The Van Allen Building, also known as Van Allen and Company Department Store, is a historic commercial building at Fifth Avenue and South Second Street in Clinton, Iowa.  The four-story building was designed by Louis Sullivan and commissioned by John Delbert Van Allen (October 5, 1850 – December 30, 1928).  Constructed 1912–1914 as a department store, it now has upper floor apartments with ground floor commercial space. The exterior has brick spandrels and piers over the structural steel skeletal frame.  Terra cotta is used for horizontal accent banding and for three slender, vertical applied mullion medallions on the front facade running through three stories, from ornate corbels at the second-floor level to huge outbursts of vivid green terra cotta foliage in the attic.  There is a very slight cornice. Black marble facing is used around the glass show windows on the first floor. The walls are made of long thin bricks in a burnt gray color with a tinge of purple. Above the ground floor all the windows are framed by a light gray terra cotta. The tile panels in Dutch blue and white pay tribute to Mr. Van Allen's Dutch heritage of which he was quite proud. (Mr. Van Allen was accepted for membership in the Holland Society of New York in 1908). The Van Allen Building was declared a National Historic Landmark in 1976 for its architecture.

Rather unusually, Van Allen and Sullivan planned the building around intended use of the interior space. The men carefully laid out floor plans and designed displays, showcases, and aisles before creating plans for the building itself. The main floor of the new store was for general dry goods and men's furnishings. The second floor was women's costumes, and the third floor household fabrics, bedding and rugs. The top floor was not planned for immediate use and intended as an area for future growth. The resulting interior design included a plan with only two interior column lines on all four floors, creating open interiors for shopping. The column lines feature three rows of interior columns spanning east–west, which allowed for three spacious retail bays averaging over 28 feet in width.

The exterior of the building was designed to have urban appeal with plain surfaces, clean lines and harmonious proportions. In order to avoid anonymity amongst other buildings, the structure features ornamentation with a strong sense of Sullivan's signature natural design motifs. Themes of dark brick and terra cotta ornamentation dominate the building's exterior design. The clean and simple lines and earth tones were intended to complement three unique ornamental terra cotta mullions. While at first glance, the mullions appear to be little more than creative personal flourish on the part of Sullivan, careful study of the building's structure reveals the genius behind the design. Sullivan used the ornamental mullions to visually correct imbalances in the building's proportions which were the result of designing the interior spaces first. Additionally, the decorative mullions serve to accentuate the height of the building and emphasize the wide spans of the interior aisles which made the building so unique.

Louis Sullivan was recommended as the architect by F.H. Shaver of the Peoples Savings Bank in Cedar Rapids, Iowa in a letter dated September 20, 1910.  In addition to mentioning the work that Sullivan was doing for him, Mr. Shaver mentioned Sullivan's Transportation Building at the 1893 World Columbian Exposition, the Auditorium Hotel and Carson Pirie Scott in Chicago, with special mention of the National Farmer's Bank of Owatonna, Minnesota and the fact that Mr. Sullivan was decorated for his work by the French government. He concluded his letter by stating, "The interesting feature of this whole matter is that Mr. Sullivan does not charge more than other architects."

On March 20, 1911, Mr. Sullivan wrote Mr. Van Allen stating, "I shall take pleasure in handling your work, and will be pleased to see you at any time, as I am now building a church as well as a bank in Cedar Rapids, Iowa."

On April 3, 1912, Mr. Sullivan wrote Mr. Van Allen stating, "My feeling is moving away from white enamelled terra cotta into a conception of brick and terra cotta in soft low tones.  I trust you will follow me with your approval as this design seems to tend this way of its own accord: That is, with a sort of logic of its own."

Mr. Van Allen's granddaughter, Mary Jane Case (1917–2004), has described how her grandfather related to her that Mr. Sullivan would sit on a keg of nails across the street from the building when it was under construction and direct the work on the building.

Gallery

See also
List of National Historic Landmarks in Iowa
National Register of Historic Places listings in Clinton County, Iowa

References

"Louis Sullivan The Function of Ornament" Edited by Wim de Witt - Chicago Historical Society - The Saint Louis Art Museum.
"Louis Sullivan Prophet of Modern Architecture" by Hugh Morrison
"Small Town Sullivan" by Blair Kamin The Chicago Tribune May 26, 2006 Section 5 p. 1
The Clinton Herald December 7, 1909 p. 8
The Clinton Herald March 24, 1910 p. 10
The Clinton Herald February 13, 1913
The Clinton Herald April 30, 1913
The Clinton Advertiser April 30, 1913
The Clinton Herald July 30, 1914 p. 5
The Clinton Advertiser August 1, 1914
The Clinton Herald September 29, 1914
The Clinton Advertiser September 29, 1914
Ryerson Library - The Art Institute of Chicago

Buildings and structures in Clinton, Iowa
Louis Sullivan buildings
National Historic Landmarks in Iowa
Commercial buildings completed in 1914
Department stores on the National Register of Historic Places
Commercial buildings on the National Register of Historic Places in Iowa
Residential buildings on the National Register of Historic Places in Iowa
National Register of Historic Places in Clinton County, Iowa
Apartment buildings in Iowa